Gorgin (also Romanized as Gorgīn; also known as Kargīn, Kergīn, and Kirgin) is a village in Khabar Rural District, in the Central District of Baft County, Kerman Province, Iran. At the 2006 census, its population was 175, in 38 families.

References 

Populated places in Baft County